Currier House is one of twelve undergraduate residential Houses of Harvard College, in Cambridge, Massachusetts, United States. Opened in September 1970, it is named after Audrey Bruce Currier, a member of the Radcliffe College Class of 1956 who, along with her husband, was killed in a plane crash in 1967. The area was formerly used as housing for Radcliffe College, and as such the four towers of Currier House are named for distinguished alumnae of Radcliffe, including the author Barbara Tuchman. Along with Cabot House and Pforzheimer House, Currier is part of the former Radcliffe Quadrangle, known colloquially as simply "the Quad."

Building
Currier House consists of four towers containing mostly single rooms adjoined by a sink room or bathroom.  Currier also has some coveted living arrangements, including the "Ten-Man," which is a suite of ten singles and three full bathrooms arranged around Harvard's largest common room, and three penthouse suites nicknamed "Solarium rooms." In 2005, Currier renovated a common space known as the "Fishbowl" to set up an entertainment center with a big screen projector and surround sound system.

Faculty Deans and Resident Dean
The current Faculty Deans are Latanya Sweeney and Sylvia Barrett. The Allston Burr Resident Dean is Laura Johnson. Previous deans have included scholar of Islam and former Dean of Harvard Divinity School William A. Graham, chemist and Nobel laureate Dudley R. Herschbach, and classicist Gregory Nagy.

Athletic success
In 2004–2005, Currier House won the Straus Cup for the first time in over twenty years.  The cup is given to the house that scores the most points in intramural athletic competition during the school year.

Student government
Student government in Currier House consists of the Currier House Committee, of which all house residents are members. The committee operates separately from the Harvard Undergraduate Council (UC), to organize student events and manage funding. The Currier HoCo, like student government organizations in the other Houses, are funded by the UC and maintained by an executive council run by students in leadership positions. Elections for the two Chair positions and the other social organization positions are held each January during the Super Bowl Halftime show, which is broadcast in the Fishbowl common space. The two HoCo co-chairs are Jacob Miller and Annie Garofalo.

Famous alumni
Notable alumni include:
 Michael Chertoff (class of 1975) 
 Yo-Yo Ma (1976)
 Bill Gates (class of 1977, but left before graduating)
 Steve Ballmer (1977)
 Caroline Kennedy (1980)
 Neil deGrasse Tyson (1980)
 Paul Attanasio (1981)
 Alan Khazei (1983)
 Tom Morello (1986)
 Sylvia Mathews Burwell (1987)
 Seth Moulton (2001)
 Damien Chazelle (2007/08)
 Justin Hurwitz (2007/08)
 Michelle Wu (2007)

Gates and Ballmer met in Currier House, where the two lived on the same floor, and formed a friendship that later led Gates to recruit his college friend to join his budding software company. Gates also described during his 2007 commencement address at Harvard how he initiated one of his first software deals while making a call from his room in Currier House.

References

External links

 Currier House official site
 Harvard Quadrangle map
 Photo album featuring Currier House life, by the Harvard Gazette

Harvard Houses
Radcliffe College and Institute